Charlotte Villiers, Countess of Clarendon (2 October 1721 – 3 September 1790), formerly Lady Charlotte Capell, was the wife of Thomas Villiers, the son of William Villiers, 2nd Earl of Jersey.  Thomas would later be raised to the peerage as Baron Hyde and subsequently as Earl of Clarendon, both titles that originated from his wife's family.

Charlotte was the daughter of William Capell, 3rd Earl of Essex, and his wife, Jane Hyde. They were married on 30 March 1752 and had four children:

Thomas Villiers, 2nd Earl of Clarendon (25 December 1753 – 7 March 1824).
John Villiers, 3rd Earl of Clarendon (14 November 1757 – 22 December 1838).
George Villiers (23 November 1759 – 21 March 1827). Father of George Villiers, 4th Earl of Clarendon.
Lady Charlotte Barbara Villiers (27 March 1761 – 9 April 1810).

From 1756, when her husband acquired the barony, she was known as Lady Hyde of Hindon, and from 1776, when the earldom of Clarendon was revived for him, she became Countess of Clarendon. She was taken ill and died at Stony Stratford, aged 68, and was buried at St Mary's Church, Watford, along with other members of the Capell family.

References

1721 births
1790 deaths
British countesses
Daughters of British earls
Capell family
Villiers family